Emperor's Ball (German:Kaiserball) is a 1956 Austrian drama film directed by Franz Antel and starring Sonja Ziemann, Rudolf Prack and Hannelore Bollmann. The film is part of a cycle of films set during the old Austro-Hungarian Empire. It was shot in Agfacolor with sets designed by Otto Pischinger.

Cast
 Sonja Ziemann as Franzi  
 Rudolf Prack as Reichsgraf Georg von Hohenegg  
 Hannelore Bollmann as Prinzessin Christine  
 Maria Andergast as Fürstin zu Schenckenberg  
 Jane Tilden as Gräfin Reichenbach  
 Ilse Peternell as Direktrice  
 Bully Buhlan as Graf Baranyi  
 Hans Olden as Erzherzog Benedikt  
 Rolf Olsen as Jean Müller  
 Paul Löwinger as Portier Bichler  
 Thomas Hörbiger as Willi  
 C.W. Fernbach as Offizier  
 Raoul Retzer as Kriminalkommissär  
 Hans Moser as Portier Rienössl

References

Bibliography 
 Jennifer M. Kapczynski & Michael D. Richardson. A New History of German Cinema. Boydell & Brewer, 2014.

External links 
 

1956 films
1950s historical comedy-drama films
1950s German-language films
Films directed by Franz Antel
Films set in the 1900s
Films scored by Hans Lang
Austrian historical comedy-drama films